Erasinus is a genus of the spider family Salticidae (jumping spiders).

All three described species are only known from males. Simon thought that they were close to Viciria. Judging from the shape of the male palp of E. gracilis, it belongs to the same genus as Epeus, which was split from Viciria in 1984.

Erasinus labiatus was transferred to Portia by Fred R. Wanless in 1978.

Name
Erasinos was a river god of Arkadia and Argos in southern Greece.

Species
 Erasinus flagellifer Simon, 1899 – Sumatra
 Erasinus flavibarbis Simon, 1902 – Java
 Erasinus gracilis Peckham & Peckham, 1907 – Borneo

Footnotes

References
  (2000): An Introduction to the Spiders of South East Asia. Malaysian Nature Society, Kuala Lumpur.
  (2007): The world spider catalog, version 8.0. American Museum of Natural History.

Salticidae
Spiders of Asia
Salticidae genera